Jacob Wood could refer to: 

Jake Wood (bodybuilding), a US Born Female Bodybuilding enthusiast
Jake Wood (baseball) (born 1937), American baseball player
Jake Wood (veteran), U.S. Marine Corps veteran and co-founder of Team Rubicon

See also
Jake Wood (born 1972), English actor
Jake Woods (born 1981), American baseball player